Rhododendron irroratum (露珠杜鹃) is a rhododendron species native to northern Vietnam and western Guizhou, southwestern Sichuan, and northern and southeastern Yunnan, China, where it grows at altitudes of . The leathery leaves are oblanceolate to narrowly elliptic, 7–14 by 2–4 cm in size. The flowers are variable in colour, and may be white or yellowish to violet-rose, but always spotted with greenish or purple flecks.

References

 " Rhododendron irroratum", Franchet, Bull. Soc. Bot. France. 34: 280. 1887.

irroratum